Salty Brine State Beach is a public recreation area occupying slightly more than  of ocean  shore in the village of Galilee, town of Narragansett, Rhode Island. Established in 1954 as Galilee State Beach, it was renamed in 1990 to honor Salty Brine, a Rhode Island radio and television personality. A  beach pavilion and boardwalk were added to the facility in 2010. The area offers ocean swimming and saltwater fishing and is open seasonally.

In the news
On July 11, 2015, the beach came to national attention when a woman suffered broken ribs and other injuries from an explosion under the sand that hurled her four feet into the air, landing her ten feet from her beach chair. The cause of the explosion was attributed to hydrogen formed by the underwater corrosion of copper in an abandoned electric cable.

References

External links
Salty Brine State Beach Rhode Island Department of Environmental Management Division of Parks & Recreation

State parks of Rhode Island
Beaches of Rhode Island
Protected areas of Washington County, Rhode Island
Protected areas established in 1954
1954 establishments in Rhode Island
Beaches of Washington County, Rhode Island